Wickham striae are whitish lines visible in the papules of lichen planus and other dermatoses, typically in the oral mucosa.  The microscopic appearance shows hypergranulosis. It is named after Louis Frédéric Wickham.

References

External links
  Picture from American Family Physician

Dermatologic signs